Since 1949, there have been 29 Japanese laureates of the Nobel Prize. The Nobel Prize is a Sweden-based international monetary prize. The award was established by the 1895 will and estate of Swedish chemist and inventor Alfred Nobel. It was first awarded in Physics, Chemistry, Physiology or Medicine, Literature, and Peace in 1901. An associated prize, thus far, the Sveriges Riksbank Prize in Economic Sciences in Memory of Alfred Nobel, also sometimes known as the Nobel Prize in Economics, has yet to be awarded to a Japanese national. 

The Nobel Prizes in the above specific sciences disciplines and the Prize in Economics, which is commonly identified with them, are widely regarded as the most prestigious award one can receive in those fields. Of Japanese winners, twelve have been physicists, eight chemists, three for literature, five for physiology or medicine, and one for efforts towards peace.

In the 21st century, in the field of natural science, the number of Japanese winners of the Nobel Prize has been second behind the U.S.

Summary

Laureates

Members of laureate organizations
The following Japanese individuals and Japan-based organizations were significant members who contributed largely in making a larger organization become a Nobel laureate.

Nominees

Notes
Physics
Shoichi Sakata reported the "Sakata model" - a model of hadrons in 1956, that inspired Murray Gell-Mann and George Zweig's quark model. Moreover, Kazuhiko Nishijima and Tadao Nakano originally given the Gell-Mann–Nishijima formula in 1953. However, 1969 physics prize was only awarded to Murray Gell-Mann. Afterward, Ivar Waller, the member of Nobel Committee for Physics was sorry that Sakata had not received a physics prize.

Yoji Totsuka was leading the experiment that the first definitive evidence for neutrino oscillations was measured, via a high-statistics, high-precision measurement of the atmospheric neutrino flux. His Super-K group also confirmed, along with the Sudbury Neutrino Observatory (SNO), the solution to the solar neutrino problem. The Nobel Prize winning physicist Masatoshi Koshiba was told that if Totsuka could extend his lifespan by eighteen months, he would receive the physics prize.

Chemistry
Eiji Osawa prediction of the C60 molecule at Hokkaido University in 1970. He noticed that the structure of a corannulene molecule was a subset of an Association football shape, and he hypothesised that a full ball shape could also exist. Japanese scientific journals reported his idea, but it did not reach Europe or the Americas. Because of this, he was not awarded the 1996 chemistry prize.

Seiji Shinkai invented the first molecular machine in 1979, but he was not awarded the 2016 chemistry prize. On the contrary, Ben Feringa, one of the 2016 Nobel laureates, made a special trip to Japan in the 1980s to ask Shinkai for advice in the research.

Physiology or Medicine
Kitasato Shibasaburō and Emil von Behring working together in Berlin in 1890 announced the discovery of diphtheria antitoxin serum; Von Behring was awarded the 1901 prize because of this work, but Kitasato was not. Meanwhile, Hideyo Noguchi and Sahachiro Hata, those who missed out on the early Nobel Prize for many times.

Katsusaburō Yamagiwa and his student Kōichi Ichikawa successfully induced squamous cell carcinoma by painting crude coal tar on the inner surface of rabbits' ears. Yamagiwa's work has become the primary basis for research of cause of cancer. However, Johannes Fibiger was awarded the 1926 medicine prize because of his incorrect Spiroptera carcinoma theory, while the Yamagiwa group was snubbed by Nobel Committee. In 1966, the former committee member Folke Henschen claimed "I was strongly advocate Dr. Yamagiwa deserve the Nobel Prize, but unfortunate it did not realize". In 2010, the Encyclopædia Britannica 's guide to Nobel Prizes in cancer research mentions Yamagiwa's work as a milestone without mentioning Fibiger.

Umetaro Suzuki completed the first vitamin complex was isolated in 1910. When the article was translated into German, the translation failed to state that it was a newly discovered nutrient, a claim made in the original Japanese article, and hence his discovery failed to gain publicity. Because of this, he was not awarded the 1929 medicine prize.

Satoshi Mizutani and Howard Martin Temin jointly discovered that the Rous sarcoma virus particle contained the enzyme reverse transcriptase, and Mizutani was solely responsible for the original conception and design of the novel experiment that confirmed Temin's provirus hypothesis. However, Mizutani was not awarded the 1975 medicine prize along with Temin.

As of 2015, there have been seven Japanese who have received the Lasker Award and twelve Japanese who have received the Canada Gairdner International Award, but only three Japanese who have received the Nobel Prize in Physiology or Medicine.

Others
A number of important Japanese native scientists were not nominated for early Nobel Prizes, such as Yasuhiko Kojima and Yasuichi Nagano (jointly discovered Interferon), Jōkichi Takamine (first isolated epinephrine), Kiyoshi Shiga (discovered Shigella dysenteriae), Tomisaku Kawasaki (Kawasaki disease is named after him), and Hakaru Hashimoto. After World War II, Reiji Okazaki and his wife Tsuneko were known for describing the role of Okazaki fragments, but he died of leukemia (sequelae of the atomic bombing of Hiroshima) in 1975 at the age of 44.

Masahiko Aoki, seen as the most likely candidate to become the first Japanese to win the Nobel Prize for economics, for developing the Institutional Comparative Analysis, he taught at Kyoto University and Stanford University. Unfortunately, he died in Palo Alto, California, in July, 2015. He was 77.

See also
 List of Japanese people
 List of Nobel laureates
 List of Asian Nobel laureates
 List of Nobel laureates affiliated with the University of Tokyo
 List of Nobel laureates affiliated with Kyoto University
 List of Nobel laureates by country

Notelist

References

External links
 All Nobel Laureates from the Nobel Foundation
 Japanese Nobel Laureates — Kyoto University
 日本人のノーベル賞受賞者一覧 — 京都大学
 Nominees from JAPAN - Nomination Database

Nobel laureates
Japanese